The Boston University Fitness and Recreation Center (or FitRec) is an athletic facility at Boston University. Built in 2004–2005 to replace the aging and inadequate Case Gym, the FitRec was built on the site of a National Guard Armory, to which there is a nod in the form of an informative plaque, found just west of the building.

The $97 million building opened in April 2005 as part of Boston University's John Hancock Student Village.  It includes an  weight and cardio room, a 1/7 mile (230 m) indoor jogging track, a climbing wall, two swimming pools, a ProShop, various gyms, racketball and squash courts, and an oft-cited lazy river.

References

Boston University
Health clubs in the United States
Medical and health organizations based in Massachusetts
University and college student recreation centers in the United States
Swimming venues in the United States
Sports venues in Boston